Tongchuan is a prefecture-level city located in central Shaanxi province, People's Republic of China on the southern fringe of the Loess Plateau that defines the northern half of the province (Shanbei) and the northern reaches of the Guanzhong Plain.

Economy
Tongchuan’s main industries are coal, building materials, machinery, textile and chemical and aluminium industry. Pottery and porcelain, with Yaozhou Kiln products are particularly well known. Tongchuan also produces medicines and food products.

Farm products include apples, hot peppers, Chinese prickly ash, garlic, flue-cured tobacco, walnuts and precious Chinese medicine herbs.   Apple wine, apple vinegar, apple soft drink which are made of apples and processing products of hot pepper, walnut etc. are well known in China and are exported to Southeast Asia.

Geography

Administrative divisions
Tongchuan city currently comprises 3 administrative county-level subdivisions including 3 district and 1 county.

Transportation 
China National Highway 210

Tourism
There are the ruins of the Yaozhou Kiln, the remains of Yuhua Palace, and many rare historical relics. The Forest of Stone Sculptures on Yaowang Mountain is a major historical relic under state protection.

References

External links

 Tongcuan city Government's official website 

 
Cities in Shaanxi
Prefecture-level divisions of Shaanxi